Nippostrongylus is a genus of nematodes belonging to the family Heligmonellidae.

The genus has almost cosmopolitan distribution.

Species:

Nippostrongylus brasiliensis 
Nippostrongylus smalesae

References

Nematodes